Sunok is a South Korean KBS1 television drama that aired from 8:30–9:30 A.M., as part of the KBS TV Novel serie. It starred Choi Ja-hye as Sunok. The series scored average ratings, less than 10%.

Plot
A baby girl was abandoned at birth. She has grown to become a woman facing her cruel destiny. She is born but their parents are too poor, so they send her to some rich family who become Sunok's stepparents and they care of her as if she was their real daughter. Later, Sunok's real father overthrows Sunok stepfather's business and becomes rich himself, leaving Sunok's family to starve. At last, Sunok's real parents get to know the truth and go to Sunok to get forgiveness. At first, Sunok denies it but at last, she forgives them. In addition, her stepfather's new business, selling antiques gets successful.

Cast

Main
 Choi Ja-hye as Park Sunok
 Hwang Dong-ju as Seo In-ho
 Kang Do-han as Jeong Yong-chil
 Park Hye-yeong as Jeong Mijo
 Choi Eun-ju as Nam Ki-sun

Supporting
 Seo In-ho, Sunok's boyfriend
 Sunok's husband, Nam Ki-sun
 Sunok's brother, Jeong yong-chil
 Sunok's friend and also a sister, Jeong Mijo
 Sunok's stepmother
 Sunok's stepfather
 Sunok stepfather's second wife
 Sunok's biological parents

Ratings
"Sunok"'s ratings were quite low and it turned out to be 7.5% average.

References

External links
 Official site

Korean-language television shows
Korean Broadcasting System television dramas